George Mortimer may refer to:

 George Ferris Whidborne Mortimer (1805–1871), English schoolmaster and divine
 George Frederick Baskerville Mortimer (1816–1854), English cricketer
 George Mortimer (officer), Marine officer who wrote an account of a voyage of John Henry Cox in 1791

See also
 George Mortimer Bibb (1776–1859), American politician
 George Mortimer Morris (1871–1954), British Indian Army officer
 George Mortimer Pullman (1831–1897), American engineer and industrialist
 Mortimer George Thoyts (1804–1875), English High Sheriff of Berkshire